The 2018 season is Helsingin Jalkapalloklubi's 110th competitive season.

Squad

On loan

Transfers

Winter

In:

Out:

.

Summer

In:

Out:

Released

Competitions

Veikkausliiga

The 2018 Veikkausliiga season began on 7 April 2018 and ends on 27 October 2018.

League table

Results summary

Results by matchday

Results

Finnish Cup

Sixth Round

Knockout stage

Final

UEFA Champions League

Qualifying rounds

UEFA Europa League

Qualifying rounds

Squad statistics

Appearances and goals

|-
|colspan="14"|Players from Klubi-04 who appeared:

|-
|colspan="14"|Players away from the club on loan:
|-
|colspan="14"|Players who left HJK during the season:

|}

Goal scorers

Disciplinary record

Notes

References

2018
HJK
HJK
HJK